"All She Wants Is" is a song by British new wave band Duran Duran.  It was released in December 1988 as the second single from the Big Thing album and reached No. 9 on the UK Singles Chart and No. 22 on the Billboard Hot 100 in the United States.

Cash Box called it a "growling, thumping rock extravaganza that's danceable."

Music video
The video for "All She Wants Is"  was shot in London with video director Dean Chamberlain, a well-known photographer who had previously taken pictures and filmed a video for the side project Arcadia. The clip won a 1988 MTV Video Music Award for innovation.

The video took nearly a month to shoot, using very long exposures to create unusual animated light effects around a girl and the surreal fixtures inside her flat. A photo from the shoot showing the three band members and the girl was used as cover art for the back side of the single.

As the band was in the middle of a hectic promotion schedule, and was unable to spend the necessary weeks standing still to shoot the video, the members each allowed a plaster life mask to be made from their faces, from which latex imitations of the band members' faces were cast.  With the masks fitted onto mannequins, Chamberlain was able to use painstakingly slow stop motion special effects.  Only a few brief scenes at the beginning and end of the video show the real band members.

B-sides, bonus tracks and remixes
The single b-side is an original medley called "I Believe/All I Need To Know".

There are 7 official mixes of "All She Wants Is". They are often credited with different names on different releases. The remixes were all done by Shep Pettibone.

 "All She Wants Is" (Album Version) - 4:33
 "All She Wants Is" (45 Mix) / (7" Version) - 4:32
 "All She Wants Is" (US Master Mix) - 7:19
 "All She Wants Is" (US Master Dub) / (Latino Dub) - 6:45
 "All She Wants Is" (Euro House Mix) / (Euro Dub Mix) - 7:33
 "All She Wants Is" (Euro House Dub I) / (Euro House Dub) / (House Dub) - 7:07
 "All She Wants Is" (Euro House Dub II) - 5:43

Formats and track listing

7": EMI. / DD 11 United Kingdom 
 "All She Wants Is" (45 Mix) – 4:36 
 "I Believe/All I Need to Know" (Medley) – 5:04

12": EMI. / 12 DD 11 United Kingdom 
 "All She Wants Is (Euro Dub Mix)" – 7:34 (a.k.a. "Euro House Mix")
 "All She Wants Is (45 Mix)" – 4:36 
 "I Believe/All I Need to Know" (Medley) – 5:04

12": EMI. / 12 DDX 11 United Kingdom 

 "All She Wants Is (US Master Mix)" – 7:19
 "All She Wants Is (45 Mix)" – 4:36 
 "I Believe/All I Need to Know (Medley)" – 5:04

12": EMI. / 12 DD-DJ11 (Promo) United Kingdom 
 "All She Wants Is" (Euro House Mix) – 7:34 (a.k.a. "Euro Dub Mix")
 "All She Wants Is" (45 Mix) – 4:36
 "All She Wants Is" (US Master Mix) – 7:19
 "All She Wants Is" (House Dub) - 7:08 (a.k.a. "Euro House Dub", "Euro House Dub I")

7": Capitol Records. / B-44287 United States 
 "All She Wants Is" (45 Mix) – 4:36
 "I Believe/All I Need to Know" (Medley) – 5:04
 Also available on MC in the US (Capitol / 4BX-44287)

12": Capitol Records. / V-15434 United States
 "All She Wants Is" (US Master Mix) – 7:16
 "All She Wants Is" (Euro House Mix) – 7:32 (a.k.a. "Euro Dub Mix")
 "All She Wants Is" (45 Mix) – 4:34 
 "I Believe/All I Need to Know" (Medley) – 5:04

12": Capitol Records. / SPRO-79483 (Promo) United States
 "All She Wants Is (US Master Mix)" – 7:16
 "All She Wants Is (US Masterdub)" – 6:43 (a.k.a. "Latino Dub")
 "All She Wants Is (Euro House Mix)" – 7:32 (a.k.a. "Euro Dub Mix")
 "All She Wants Is (Euro House Dub I)" – 7:07 (a.k.a. "House Dub', "Euro House Dub")
 "All She Wants Is (Euro House Dub II)" – 5:43

12": EMI / K 060 20 32366 Netherlands 
 "All She Wants Is" (House Dub) – 7:07 (a.k.a. "Euro House Dub", "Euro House Dub I")
 "All She Wants Is" (Latino Dub) – 6:44 (a.k.a. "US Masterdub")
 "All She Wants Is" (7" Version) – 4:31
 Also released on German CD (EMI-Electrola / CDP 560-20-3236-2)

CD: EMI / CD DD 11 (United Kingdom)
 "All She Wants Is" (45 Mix) – 4:36 
 "Skin Trade" (Parisian Mix) – 8:10
 "I Believe/All I Need to Know" (Medley) – 5:09
 Also available on 3" CD in the US (Capitol / C3-44287-2)

CD: Toshiba-EMI / XP12-5006 (Japan)
 "All She Wants Is" (45 Mix) – 4:36 
 "All She Wants Is" (Euro Dub Mix) – 7:34 (a.k.a. "Euro House Mix")
 "I Believe/All I Need to Know" (Medley) – 5:09
 3" CD reworking of the first UK 12"

CD: Part of "Singles Box Set 1986-1995" boxset 
 "All She Wants Is" (45 Mix) – 4:36
 "I Believe/All I Need to Know" (Medley) – 5:04
 "All She Wants Is (US Master Mix)" – 7:16
 "All She Wants Is" (Euro Dub Mix) – 7:34 (a.k.a. "Euro House Mix")
 "Skin Trade" (Parisian Mix) – 8:10

Covers, samples, & media references
"All She Wants Is" can be heard as background music playing in a bar in the 2003 film Monster.

"All She Wants Is" was used in season 5, episode 5 of Cold Case in 2007.

Faithful Dawn recorded a cover of the song which was only available on a limited edition EP at Whitby 5.5 in 1998.

Chart positions
"All She Wants Is" had a bigger impact in the UK than its predecessor ("I Don't Want Your Love"), hitting the top ten; it was the last of twelve UK top ten hits for Duran Duran during the 1980s.

In Europe as in the United States the single became a smash dance hit, reaching high positions on the dance charts.

 No. 9 UK Singles Chart
 No. 22 Billboard Hot 100
 No. 24 Billboard Modern Rock Tracks 	
 No. 1 Billboard Hot Dance Club Play
 No. 2 Italy
 No. 1 European Dance charts
 No. 74 Australia (ARIA Chart)

Other appearances
Aside from the single and Big Thing, "All She Wants Is" appears on:
 1989 - Decade (except in Brazil)
 1998 - Greatest
 1998 - Strange Behaviour (Disc 2)
 2005 - Singles Box Set 1986-1995

Personnel
Duran Duran are:
Simon Le Bon - Vocals
John Taylor - Bass
Nick Rhodes - Keyboards

With:
Chester Kamen - Guitars
Sterling Campbell - Drums
Warren Cuccurullo - Guitars
Production:
 Duran Duran - Producer
 Jonathan Elias - Producer
 Daniel Abraham - Producer, Mixer (45 Mix)
 Shep Pettibone - Remixer
 Goh Hotoda - Remix engineer
 Freddie Stopler - Heavy Breathing

External links
 TM's Duran Duran Discography

References

1988 singles
Duran Duran songs
Freestyle music songs
1988 songs
Capitol Records singles
EMI Records singles
Songs written by Simon Le Bon
Songs written by John Taylor (bass guitarist)
Songs written by Nick Rhodes